The Spine Journal is a peer-reviewed medical journal covering research related to the spine. It is the official journal of the North American Spine Society. The journal was established in 2001 and is published by Elsevier.

According to the Journal Citation Reports, The Spine Journal has a 2020 impact factor of 4.166.

References

External links 
 

Publications established in 2001
Orthopedics journals
Elsevier academic journals
Monthly journals
English-language journals